Jerry Mahlman (February 21, 1940 – November 28, 2012) was an American meteorologist and climatologist.

Biography
Mahlman was born on February 21, 1940, in Crawford, Nebraska, and received his undergraduate degree from Chadron State College in 1962 and his Ph.D. from Colorado State University in 1967. From 1970 until 2000 he worked at the Geophysical Fluid Dynamics Laboratory of the National Oceanic and Atmospheric Administration at Princeton, serving as director from 1984-2000. He was most recently a Senior Research Associate at the National Center for Atmospheric Research. Mahlman died on November 28, 2012, in Buffalo Grove, Illinois, at the age of 72.

Mahlman was a pioneer in the use of computational models of the atmosphere to examine the interactions between atmospheric chemistry and physics. His early work focussed on understanding the distribution of fallout from atmospheric nuclear bomb tests. He then became interested in the physics of transport in the stratosphere, in which mixing is relatively weak and parcels of air can be tracked for long periods of time. At the Geophysical Fluid Dynamics Laboratory Mahlman collaborated with Syukoro Manabe to develop dynamical models of the stratospheric circulation that demonstrated the importance of meanders in the polar jet stream for producing exchange between the polar and subtropical stratosphere. He then worked to extend these models to include the chemistry of nitrous oxide and ozone. While Mahlman was skeptical of early work that suggested that chlorofluorocarbons were responsible for depleting the ozone layer, measurements of high levels of free chlorine in the ozone hole caused him to change his mind in late 1987, and he later was one of the first to sound the alarm about ozone depletion over the Arctic.

As director of the Geophysical Fluid Dynamics Laboratory, he became involved in interpreting the results of computer models of global warming for the public and policymakers. 
On the topic of climate change before the U.S. Senate Committee on Commerce, Science, and Transportation on March 3, 2004, he said:

Mahlman received numerous awards and honors, including the Carl-Gustaf Rossby Research Medal of the American Meteorology Society, the Gold Medal of the United States Department of Commerce, and the Presidential Rank Award of Distinguished Executive, the highest honor awarded to a federal employee.

References

External links 
 CV
 Senate testimony on Climate Change, 2004
 Review of The Skeptical Environmentalist (follow link)
 A CONVERSATION WITH JERRY MAHLMAN - Listening to the Climate Models, and Trying to Wake Up the World
 Interview: Straight talk about climate change. Jerry Mahlman on dealing with your grandkids' problem
 Jerry Mahlman: Obituary

1940 births
2012 deaths
American climatologists
Carl-Gustaf Rossby Research Medal recipients
People from Crawford, Nebraska
Colorado State University alumni
Chadron State College alumni